San, Burkina Faso is a town in the Pompoï Department of Balé Province in southern Burkina Faso. As of 2008, the town had a total population of 1320.

References

External links
Satellite map at Maplandia.com

Populated places in the Boucle du Mouhoun Region
Balé Province